Amebis from Kamnik is a major company in Slovenia in the field of language technologies. Its current manager is Miro Romih. The company has published a number of machine-readable dictionaries and encyclopedic dictionaries (e.g. ASP(32) dictionaries), and developed spell checkers, grammar checkers, hyphenators and lemmatizers for Slovene, Serbian and Albanian languages. In co-operation with the Jožef Stefan Institute they have developed a speech synthesiser and screen reader Govorec (Speaker). They have also provided technical support for the largest text corpus of Slovene, called FidaPLUS.

Amebis also developed the system of machine translation Amebis Presis, which incorporates Slovenian language.

See also 

 Babelnet
 vidby
 Deepl

References

External links 
Amebis home page

Software companies of Slovenia
Natural language processing software
Machine translation software